Fengrun District is a district of the city of Tangshan, Hebei province, People's Republic of China.

Administrative divisions

Subdistricts:
Taiping Road Subdistrict, Yanshan Road Subdistrict, Gengyang Subdistrict

Towns:
Fengrun Town, Laozhuangzi, Rengezhuang, Zuojiawu, Quanhetou, Wangguanying, Huoshiying, Hancheng, Chahe, Xinjuntun, Xiaozhanggezhuang, Fengdengwu, Lizhaozhuang, Baiguantun, Shigezhuang, Shaliuhe, Qishuzhuang, Yangguanlin

Townships:
Jiangjiaying Township, Huanxizhuang Township, Yinchengpu Township, Liujiaying Township, Changzhuang Township

Climate

Economy 
CRRC Tangshan, a subsidiary of CRRC producing rolling stock, is headquartered in Fengrun District.

References

External links

County-level divisions of Hebei
Tangshan